The 1973 Brazilian Grand Prix was a Formula One motor race held at Interlagos on February 11, 1973. It was race 2 of 15 in both the 1973 World Championship of Drivers and the 1973 International Cup for Formula One Manufacturers. It was also the first ever world championship race to be held in Brazil. The race was won by home town hero Emerson Fittipaldi after starting from first row beside Ronnie Peterson, who claimed the first pole position in his Formula One career, both driving Lotus. Jackie Stewart finished in second position, driving a Tyrrell. Denny Hulme finished in third position, driving a McLaren.

Classification

Qualifying

Race

Championship standings after the race

Drivers' Championship standings

Constructors' Championship standings

Note: Only the top five positions are included for both sets of standings.

References

Brazilian Grand Prix
Brazilian Grand Prix
Grand Prix
Brazilian Grand Prix